Denver Health Paramedic Division is a public, hospital-based paramedic service based at Denver Health Medical Center in Denver, Colorado, in the United States.

Denver Health Paramedics are contracted to provide the 911 medical services to The City and County of Denver, The City of Glendale, the City of Sheridan, City of Englewood, the "Skyline" portion of unincorporated Arapahoe County and  Denver International Airport.

The Denver Health Paramedic Division has a fleet of 36 ambulances (34 ALS) (2 Critical Care Transport). At peak times it has 24 advanced life support ambulances available, most staffed by two paramedics.  

Denver Paramedics respond to an average of 130,000 calls for service a year, an average of 355 calls a day. More than 90,000 patients are transported to Denver area hospitals a year by Denver Paramedics.

The largest number of emergency calls that Denver Paramedics respond to are auto accidents, alcohol intoxication, altered mental status, psychiatric emergencies, falls, chest pain, and shortness of breath, followed by assaults, abdominal pain, seizure, and overdose. Cardiac arrest calls account for one half of one percent of all emergency calls.

See also
Denver Health Medical Center

References

External links
Official website for Denver EMS

Organizations based in Denver
Ambulance services in the United States
Medical and health organizations based in Colorado